Neftyanik Almetyevsk is an ice hockey team in Almetyevsk, Russia. They play in the VHL, the Supreme Hockey League, which is the second level of Russian ice hockey.

History
The club was founded in 1965 as Sputnik. In 1986, they were renamed Neftyanik, Russian for oiler. In 2008, Neftyanik joined the Vysshaya Liga (VHL), and affiliated with Ak Bars Kazan of the KHL.

Achievements
Pervaya Liga champion: 1979.
Vysshaya Liga champion: 1994, 2000.

External links
 Official site

Ice hockey teams in Russia